Dexter Park may refer to:
 Dexter Park (Chicago) 
 Dexter Park (Queens)
 Dexter Training Ground Park, in Providence, Rhode Island